Tixcocoba is a monotypic genus of North American sac spiders containing the single species, Tixcocoba maya. It was first described by Willis J. Gertsch in 1977, and has only been found in Mexico.

References

Clubionidae
Monotypic Araneomorphae genera
Spiders of Mexico